Aleksei Zelensky (born March 7, 1971) is a Russian luger who competed in the early 1990s.

Career 
Competing in two Winter Olympics, he earned his best finish of seventh in the men's doubles event at Lillehammer in 1994. Aleksei Zelensky has also performed in the 2006 film The Island as the young Tikhon.

See also 

 List of Russian sportspeople

References
1992 luge men's doubles results
1994 luge men's doubles results
1998 luge men's singles results

1971 births
Living people
Lugers at the 1992 Winter Olympics
Lugers at the 1994 Winter Olympics
Russian male lugers
Olympic lugers of the Unified Team
Soviet male lugers
Olympic lugers of Russia